Jurys Inn is a hotel group operating across the UK, Ireland and Czech Republic, with 36 locations under the Jurys Inn brand and 7 under the Leonardo brand. In total, the company operates 38 hotels in the UK, four in Ireland and one in the Czech Republic with some 7,500 rooms between them, served by 4,000 employees. The group was founded in Ireland in 1993, gradually expanding its operations ever since.

Jurys Inn is itself a member of the Leonardo Hotels Group, a wholly-owned subsidiary of Fattal Hotels, which operates more than 160 hotels in 16 countries. Fattal runs the operating platform for all 36 hotels under the Jurys Inn brand, as well as having the leaseholds for 15 of these. In 2022, all 35 Jurys Inn hotels in the UK and Ireland were rebranded as Leonardo hotels.

Jurys Inn is also part-owned by Swedish company Pandox AB, a European hotel property investor with 122 hotels in 11 countries, including the freehold of 20 Jurys Inn hotels.

History 
The heritage of the Jurys Group can be traced back to 1881 when William Jury opened his first boarding house in Dublin. The first Doyle Hotel, The Montrose, was built in Stillorgan, Dublin, in 1964 by PV Doyle.

1993 saw the introduction of the Jurys Inns brand with the opening of the Galway and Christchurch (Dublin) Inns, in April and May respectively.

The chain opened its first hotel in Northern Ireland in Belfast in April 1997. It expanded into Great Britain with a hotel in London in May 1998.

The Jurys Hotel Group acquired the Doyle portfolio of Dublin, London and Washington DC in 1999, and the newly-enlarged organisation became known as Jurys Doyle Hotel Group Ltd.

Further expansion came in 2001, with the acquisition of two properties owned by Chamberlain Hotels Limited.

The group was then acquired by Quinlan Private in a €1.165 billion takeover in 2008, while the Oman Investment Fund invested €200 million in a 50% stake.

In August 2009, the group opened its first hotel on the European mainland – in Prague, the capital of the Czech Republic. In 2014, three of the company's London hotels (Islington, Chelsea and Heathrow Airport) were brought under the Hilton Worldwide chain through a franchise agreement and rebranded accordingly – the former two becoming DoubleTree by Hilton hotels and the latter a Hilton Garden Inn. 

Throughout 2015, Jurys Inn added 9 hotels that previously operated under the Thistle Hotels and The Hotel Collection brands: Jurys Inn Cheltenham, Jurys Inn Cardiff, Jurys Inn East Midlands Airport, Jurys Inn Oxford, Jurys Inn Middlesbrough, Jurys Inn Brighton Waterfront, Jurys Inn Hinckley Island, Jurys Inn Aberdeen Airport and Jurys Inn Inverness.

In December 2017, the Jurys Inn Group was acquired by Swedish hotel group Pandox and Israeli group Fattal Hotels from US private equity group Lone Star for £800 million (€908 million). This portfolio of 37 hotels includes the entire Jurys Inn portfolio of 36 hotels, along with one hotel at London's Heathrow airport, currently trading as a Hilton Garden Inn. 

In April 2022, the Fattal Hotel Group announced that all Jurys Inn Hotels would be rebranded as Leonardo in autumn 2022. The Group already operates 145 Leonardo-branded hotels worldwide.

Locations 
Under the Jurys Inn hotel brand, the company operates 36 hotels across the UK, Ireland and Czech Republic.

Awards 
The chain has received the following accolades:
 Business Travel Awards: Best Small Hotel Group 2017, 2018
 British Travel Awards: Best International Mid-Scale Hotel brand 2015, 2016
 Business Travel Awards: Best Hotel Brand 2010, 2012, 2015
 Irish Travel Industry Awards: Best Irish Hotel Chain 2012, 2013 and 2014

See also

References

External links 

 

1881 establishments in Ireland
Companies based in Dublin (city)
Hotels established in 1881
Hospitality companies of Ireland
Hotel chains in the United Kingdom
Private equity portfolio companies